Tragic Wand is a crime novel by the American writer James N. Tucker set in 1990s Pittsburgh, Pennsylvania. 
It opens with the story of Assistant District Attorney Tory Welch being attacked at the office of plastic surgeon Marshall Cutter. Her friend, protagonist Dr. Jack Merlin, surgeon, part-time magician and sleuth, gets involved in the case.

Sources
Contemporary Authors Online. The Gale Group, 2006. PEN (Permanent Entry Number):  0000142340.

External links
  Pittsburgh Post-Gazette book review

2000 American novels
American crime novels
Novels set in Pittsburgh